The Kerensky offensive, also commonly known as the July offensive or Galician offensive, was the last Russian offensive in World War I. It took place in July 1917. It was decided by Alexander Kerensky, Minister of War in the Russian provisional government, and led by General Aleksei Brusilov. Such a decision was ill-timed, because, following the February Revolution, there were strong popular demands for peace, especially within the Russian Army, whose fighting capabilities were quickly deteriorating.

The Russian provisional government was greatly weakened by this military catastrophe, and the possibility of another revolution by the Bolsheviks became increasingly real. Far from strengthening Russian army morale, this offensive proved that Russian army morale no longer existed. No Russian general could now count on the soldiers under his command actually doing what they were ordered to do. This offensive also helped start the July Days. One last fight took place between the Germans and the Russians in this war. On 1 September 1917 the Germans attacked and captured Riga. The Russian soldiers defending the town refused to fight and fled from the advancing German troops.

Background 

Russian War Minister Alexander Kerensky, despite the events in February and March 1917, promised the Entente that Russia could still fulfill its promises for a summer offensive. Supreme commander Aleksei Brusilov planned the attacks but according to Prit Buttar, "Brusilov warned Kerensky that there was no enthusiasm amongst the troops in the front line for an attack."  This prompted Kerensky to visit the front lines, "...exhorting the troops to fight heroically in defence of the revolution, which he told them was threatened by German militarism."

Discipline within the Russian Army had reached a point of crisis since the Tsar's abdication. The Petrograd Soviet Order No. 1 tremendously weakened the power of officers, giving an overriding mandate to "soldier committees". The abolition of the death penalty was another contributing factor, as was the high presence of revolutionary agitators at the front including Bolshevik agitators, who promoted an anti-war agenda (and whom Kerensky tolerated considerably more than conservative agitators). What is more, the High Command failed to act appropriately, as they failed to effectively combat the democratisation of the army and were sluggish in reacting to the difficulties that the officers had faced. There were very few commands that Stavka was able to implement in regards to controlling the body of troops and restoring officer power; simply because they would have been ignored by the men.

According to Buttar, "As a result of the weakening of the army by the revolution and a catastrophic fall in output from Russia's munitions factories, the new offensive planned for the summer of 1917 would have to be more limited." On 16 July, the West Front would attack, followed by the Northern Front on 18 July, and the Romanian Front on 22 July. The Eleventh Army, commanded by Ivan Georgevich Erdeli, would attack the seam between Felix Graf von Bothmer's South Army and Eduard von Böhm-Ermolli's Second Army.

Offensive 
On 29 June, the Eleventh Army started its artillery bombardment, and on 1 July, the Russians were able to capture Koniukhy.  On 2 July the Russians were able to advance through Zboriv. On 3 July, fighting continued but little territory changed sides.  By then the Russians had lost 40,000 men, while the defenders only 12,500.  According to Buttar, "... gains were modest and bought at huge cost...Although the Russian Army had demonstrated that it still had the ability to mount an offensive, it also showed it troops...were unreliable, particularly if prolonged fighting was required."  In the meantime, Bothmer was preparing a large counteroffensive.

On 6 July, Lavr Kornilov's Russian Eighth Army commenced its attack on Stanislau, defended by Karl Tersztyánszky von Nádas' K.u.k. Third Army. On 8 July, the Russians had captured Yamnytsia, and on 9 July advanced  from Stanislau to Kalusz. On 10 July, Tersztyánszky was replaced by Karl Křitek, as German reinforcements arrived to stem the Russian advance into Halicz and Nowica.  On 11 July, the Russians were able to take Kalusz, and on 11 July, moved against Voinyliv. On 12 July, Kritek took command of the Third Army, and by 16 July, had retaken Kalusz. The Russian West Front attacks on 7 July made only modest gains, which were soon relinquished, and the Northern Front attacks lasted less than a day. According to Buttar, "It was the high tide mark for the armies of Russia."

The Russian advance collapsed altogether by 16 July. On 19 July the Germans and Austro-Hungarians counterattacked, led by Arnold von Winckler, meeting little resistance and advancing through Galicia and Ukraine as far as the Zbruch River. "The only limit to the German advance was the lack of the logistical means to occupy more territory". According to Buttar, "Eleventh Army had effectively disintegrated and Seventh Army was rapidly following suit. To the south of the Dniester, Eighth Army began to pull back..."

On 25 July, the Russians abandoned Tarnopol as was Stanislau. On 2 August, they abandoned Czernowitz.

Aftermath 

According to Buttar, "But more important than the change of territory was the complete disintegration of the Russian Army. Those killed, wounded or taken prisoner exceeded 400,000; the number of deserters was perhaps just as great." Kerensky blamed Brusilov for the failed offensive, and Kornilov replaced Brusilov as commander-in-chief. Kerensky expected Kornilov to restore discipline, and the death penalty for desertion was re-imposed by Kornilov and the Russian Provisional Government as a consequence. This led to a period of unrest in Petrograd known as the July Days.

References 

1917 in Austria-Hungary
1917 in Russia
Battles of the Eastern Front (World War I)
Battles of World War I involving Austria-Hungary
Battles of World War I involving Russia
Battles of World War I involving Romania
Battles of World War I involving Germany
Russian Provisional Government
Conflicts in 1917
July 1917 events
Ukraine in World War I
History of Chernivtsi Oblast
History of Ternopil Oblast
History of Ivano-Frankivsk Oblast
History of Lviv Oblast